Bermuda Triangle is the eighth studio album by Buckethead. The album is primarily an electronica-based collaboration with Extrakd, who also produced and mixed the album.

The album has been described as an "instrumental underground hip-hop/electro-funk fantasia" and "snippets of blazing metal, washes of delayed patterns, relaxed lines matched with stuttering drums, and vice versa", dealing with several Bermuda Triangle incidents and other sea/sailor related themes.

The album was recorded on a portable multi-track recorder.

Track listing
All tracks written by Buckethead and Extrakd.

Notes
 "Mausoleum Door" includes a sample from the 1979 movie Phantasm.
 "Isle of Dead" includes a sample from the 1975 movie Death Race 2000.
 "911" was recorded on September 11, 2001. Buckethead said: "If the world is going to blow up, I may as well go out soloing."

Personnel
Performers
Buckethead - electric guitar, bass guitar (all tracks, except "Sucked Under")
Extrakd - MPC 3000 bass, SH101 turntable, Roland SP-808

Additional Musicians
Bobafett - bass guitar (on "Sucked Under"), click track (on "Phantom Lights")
Brain - drums, percussion (on "Flight 19")

Production
Produced and mixed by Extrakd.
Recorded at Davey Jones' Locker.
Graphics by P-Sticks and Flavor Innovator.com.
Executive producer Pale Ryder/Snow Peas.

Thank yous
Extrakd thanks:
Buckethead, J Free, Brain, D Styles, House, Dr. Ware, M.I.R.V., Barney, P-Sticks, Bobafett, EDDIE DEF, Catalyst, Gonervill.
Buckethead thanks:
My family, Big D, Bill Walton, Brain, Extrakd, P-Sticks, Jon Freeman, Ed Shakey, Maximum Bob, Dr. Arlo Gordin.

References

2002 albums
Buckethead albums